Abu Yazid Makhlad ibn Kaydad (– 19 August 947), known as the Man on the Donkey, was an Ibadi Berber of the Banu Ifran tribe who led a rebellion against the Fatimid Caliphate in Ifriqiya (modern Tunisia and eastern Algeria) starting in 944. Abu Yazid conquered Kairouan for a time, but was eventually driven back and defeated by the Fatimid caliph al-Mansur bi-Nasr Allah.

Early life
Abu Yazid's father Kayrad was a Zenata Berber trans-Saharan trader from Taqyus or Tozeur in the district of Chott el Djerid, then still known by its ancient name, Qastiliya. His mother Sabika was a Black African slave, bought by Kayrad at Tadmakat. Abu Yazid was born , south of the Sahara Desert, either in Gao or in Tadmakka (modern-day Essouk). Coupled with his mother's descent, this brought him the sobriquet "the Black Ethiop" (al-Ḥabashī al-Aswad). Abu Yazid studied the Ibadi doctrine (madhhab) and worked in Tahert as a schoolmaster, before moving to Takyus around 909, during the overthrow of the Aghlabid emirs and the establishment of the Fatimid Caliphate by Abdullah al-Mahdi Billah.

In 928, Abu Yazid began his anti-Fatimid agitation. He was arrested but quickly released, and moved to the Aurès Mountains in what is now eastern Algeria, finding refuge with the Hawwara tribe. The area had in the previous decades been converted to the Nukkari branch of Ibadi Islam, and was a major centre of the sect, with its own local imam, Abu Ammar Abd al-Hamid al-A'ma. Abu Yazid soon succeeded in gaining a large following among the Hawwara, and was elected by them as their leader (shaykh al-Muslimīn, "elder of the true believers"). Thereupon Abu Ammar relinquished his leadership to him as the more worthy one (afḍal), in accordance with the Nukkari doctrine. When Fatimid agents arrested Abu Yazid again in Tozeur, Abu Ammar broke him out of prison. Abu Yazid then spent a year at Sumata, before returning to the Aurès.

Rebellion
From 937, Abu Yazid began to openly preach holy war against the Fatimids. His movement was the spiritual heir to a number of tendencies endemic in the Maghreb: the Ibadi movement, with its anti-Arab and pro-Berber chauvinism and its insistence that leadership belonged to the "best Muslim", in marked contrast to the Fatimids' claims to a hereditary imamate; the anti-imperial traditions of the great Berber Revolt against the Umayyad Caliphate in 740; and the strong messianic traditions of the Maghreb, which had welcomed and sheltered the Alids persecuted by the Abbasid Caliphate, and which would recur throughout history, culminating in the messianic empire of the Almohads.

Abu Yazid himself cut a messianic figure: his appearance fitted the signs of a prophet in Islamic messianic tradition, such as a mole on his shoulder; of advanced age, dressed in rags and lame, he rode a donkey, which gave him the nickname "Man on the Donkey" or "Lord of the Donkey". The "awaited prophet who would come riding on an ass" was a figure with a long tradition in Judaic, and later Islamic, eschatology, was associated with Jesus and Muhammad, and was emulated by several would-be prophets during the early Islamic centuries. Even his pejorative sobriquet  was often held to have messianic connotations. On the other hand, Abu Yazid's Fatimid enemies cast him as the "False Messiah".

Fall of Kairouan
In 943, Abu Yazid's followers descended from the mountains to overthrow the Fatimids. The attack was initially notably successful, capturing Tébessa, Marmajanna, al-Urbus (ancient Laribus), and Béja. His forces finally captured the old Aghlabid capital, Kairouan, on 15 October 944, where he put the town's qadi and garrison commander to death. The mostly Sunni inhabitants of Kairouan, who greatly resented Fatimid rule, were initially supportive of Abu Yazid's takeover, but the unruly behaviour of his Berber followers quickly alienated them. After the conquest of Kairouan, however, Abu Yazid began to abandon his Spartan habits for silk clothes, and his characteristic donkey for thoroughbred horses, which estranged his more austere followers.

Failure at al-Mahdiya
Leaving Abu Ammar and his own son to govern Kairouan in his name, Abu Yazid moved to capture the final Fatimid stronghold, the coastal palace city of al-Mahdiya. On 2 November 944, he defeated and killed the Fatimid general Maysur, opening the path to the city. The first attack on the city, on 21 January 945, reached the palace mosque courtyard, but was eventually pushed back. The city was placed under siege, which lasted until September 945, when Fatimid counterattacks forced Abu Yazid to retreat to Kairouan. There he abandoned the luxuries he had adopted and returned to his previous austere life, leading to a resurgence in Berber support for his cause. Seeking allies against the Fatimids, Abu Yazid also sent some Kairouan notables as envoys to the Spanish Umayyads. After this first embassy was well received, Abu Yazid sent his son Ayyub to pledge allegiance to the Umayyad caliph Abd al-Rahman III, who in turn promised to send support.

During the following months, heavy fighting between Abu Yazid's and the Fatimid forces occurred at Tunis, which was repeatedly captured by both sides, and Béja. In November, one of Abu Yazid's sons, Ayyub, was defeated by the Fatimids under al-Hasan ibn Ali al-Kalbi, before in turn defeating the latter. Al-Hasan ibn Ali withdrew to the territories of the Kutama Berbers in Lesser Kabylia, who were the mainstay of the Fatimid regime; from there he captured the fortresses of Tijis and Baghaya, threatening Abu Yazid's rear.

Siege of Sousse and death of al-Qa'im

On 13 January 946, Abu Yazid began his siege of the coastal town of Sousse. On 18 May 946, Caliph al-Qa'im bi-Amr Allah died and was succeeded by his son al-Mansur Billah. To avoid giving the rebels any advantage, al-Mansur and his government hid the death of his father, a task made easier by the reclusive life al-Qa'im had led, rarely venturing out of his palace during his reign. All public business and ceremonies were still conducted in al-Qa'im's name, and Isma'il acted ostensibly only as his heir-designate. Even the regnal name of al-Mansur ("the Victorious") was only publicly assumed after the final suppression of the uprising.

The new ruler quickly gave proof of his ability. Already before his father's death, on 16 May, he sent by sea weapons and supplies to Sousse, and within days launched a coordinated attack to relieve the city: on 26 May, the garrison of Sousse, assisted by Kutama Berber cavalry from the south and troops landed by sea from the north, broke the siege of the city and forced Abu Yazid to withdraw his forces inland towards Kairouan.

Battle for Kairouan
Abu Yazid retreated towards Kairouan, only to find that the populace, exasperated by the exactions of his Berber partisans, had risen in revolt and shut the gates against him. After ransoming Abu Ammar from captivity, he established a camp two days' march from the city. In the meantime, al-Mansur issued a full amnesty to the notables of Kairouan in return for their renewed loyalty, and on 28 May, the caliph entered the city with his troops, and set up a fortified camp south of it. Abu Yazid attacked the camp on the morning of 5 June, and was only thrown back with great difficulty, with al-Mansur himself reportedly rallying the defenders.

The two armies remained entrenched around Kairouan for the next two months, engaging in frequent clashes. Abu Yazid tried several times to take the city gates by assault, but al-Mansur had established smaller fortified camps to protect them. Abu Yazid tried to force the Fatimids to withdraw by sending his son to raid the environs of al-Mahdiya, where many of the Kutama had settled their families; but although al-Mansur sent some troops to shield them, he refused to move his main army. While al-Mansur was slowly building up his numerically inferior forces with contingents from the remote provinces of the Fatimid empire, Abu Yazid's support began to dwindle as his followers abandoned his camp; only the Hawwara and Banu Kamlan Berbers remained steadfastly loyal to him. With increasing confidence, al-Mansur marched his army out to provoke a pitched battle, but Abu Yazid refused. Finally, on 13 August the Fatimids stormed the rebel camp, and Abu Yazid with his troops broke and fled.

The victory proved doubly fortuitous for al-Mansur, as an Umayyad fleet, dispatched to assist Abu Yazid, turned back after reaching Ténès, when its commander heard news of the Fatimid victory at Kairouan. In the meantime, al-Hasan al-Kalbi gathered his Kutama at Constantine, and recaptured Béja and Tunis. With Abu Yazid in retreat, he now joined his forces with al-Mansur's army.

Pursuit by al-Mansur
On 24 October, al-Mansur left Kairouan in pursuit of the retreating Abu Yazid. By early December, the Fatimid caliph recovered Marmajanna, Béja, Billizma, Tubna (ancient Tubunae), and Biskra. The Fatimids were greeted as liberators by the locals, and received the submission of Ibn Hazar, the leader of the Zenata Berbers, and the governor of Msila and the Zab region, Ja'far ibn Ali ibn Hamdun. With the lands of the Zenata now barred to him, Abu Yazid turned south to bypass them through the desert. Al-Mansur tried to follow him, but at Biskra he was forced to stop, as the local guides warned him that the route followed by the Kharijite leader and his followers was extremely dangerous.

After crossing the desert, Abu Yazid established himself in the Jabal Salat mountains, west of the Chott el Hodna lake. As a result, the Fatimid army turned back from Biskra to Tubna, and thence marched west, along the northern shore of Chott el Hodna. Abu Yazid confronted them at Maqqara, but was defeated in battle on 9 December 946, after which he fled to the mountains of Jabal Salat. The victory allowed al-Mansur to secure his control over Msila, and brought the submission of the local tribes and towns. Shortly after, Abu Yazid launched an attack on al-Mansur's army camp near Msila, but was again beaten back. Al-Mansur sent his troops into the Hodna Mountains to pursue the rebel, but Abu Yazid again fled to the Jabal Salat. When the Fatimid troops pursued him there in late December, he again fled to the desert, and this time al-Mansur was determined to follow him. After a grueling eleven-day march in the desert he was forced to turn back, only for the heavy winter to take further toll on his army; the Fatimid caliph himself fell heavily ill due to the rigours of the campaign and was bedridden for two weeks. At this point, Abu Yazid was near despair, and contemplated abandoning the fight and returning to his homeland south of the Sahara. It was only the protestations of his followers from the Hawwara and Banu Kamlan tribes that convinced him to persist.

Abu Yazid now settled in the ruined fortress of Azbih (the Byzantine-era Zabi Iustiniana) near Msila. In the meantime, the Zenata Berbers also submitted to Fatimid authority, thus cutting off Abu Yazid's supply routes. On 6 March, al-Mansur, accompanied by 4,000 of his own cavalry and 500 Sanhaja, set out for Azbih. They found the fortress deserted, but as they turned back, the rear guard was suddenly attacked by Abu Yazid and his men. In the ensuing battle, the Fatimid ruler again prevailed, and Abu Yazid, wounded, barely managed to escape. His son Yunus was killed, and 1070 severed heads of his followers were sent as token of victory to Kairouan by al-Mansur.

Siege of Kiyana and death
Abu Yazid fled once more to the Hodna Mountains, and al-Mansur pursued him there. The Fatimid troops pursued the rebel leader relentlessly, over narrow mountain paths. Abu Yazid's camp was captured and torched, but he managed to find refuge in the fortress of Kiyana (close to the later Beni Hammad Fort). Al-Mansur did not immediately attack him there, but instead methodically subdued the surrounding mountains to deprive him of any support. On 26 April, al-Mansur began his siege of the fortress, with siege engines shipped from Ifriqiya over sea and carried over the mountains. The besieged tried repeatedly to break the siege with sallies, but were pushed back. In early June, the neighbouring fortresses of Shakir and Aqqar, also held by rebels, surrendered, and on 14 August 947, the final attack on Kiyana was launched. After bitter fighting, around noon the defence was broken, and the besieged withdrew to a keep. Al-Mansur offered a pardon if they would hand over Abu Yazid, but they refused. At dawn on the next day, the besieged tried to break through to safety, but were defeated. Abu Ammar was killed, but Abu Yazid managed to escape, only to fall in a ravine and be captured. Heavily wounded, he was interrogated by the caliph, before dying of his injuries after four days, on 19 August.

Abu Yazid's skin was salted and stuffed, to be paraded in public in every town the victorious caliph passed on his way back, sat on a camel and dressed in a tall heretic's cap, with specially trained monkeys pulling at his beard and giving blows to his head. Abu Yazid's son Fadl resisted for a while in the Aurès and the area of Qafsa, but he was killed in battle in May/June 948. His severed head was dispatched to the caliph, who sent it together with the stuffed skin of his father to Sicily as a warning. The ship sank, but Abu Yazid's corpse was washed ashore at al-Mahdiya, where it was crucified and publicly displayed. Abu Yazid's other sons, Yazid and Ayyub, tried to continue the resistance in the Aurès, but they too were soon after killed.

Legacy 
Abu Yazid's defeat was a watershed moment for the Fatimid dynasty. As the historian Michael Brett comments, "in life, Abu Yazid had brought the [Fatimid] dynasty to the brink of destruction; in death he was a godsend", as it allowed the dynasty to relaunch itself following the failures of al-Qa'im's reign. At the same time, Abu Yazid's rebellion marks the swansong of militant Kharijism in the Maghreb. Following his defeat, Kharijism was confined to marginalized groups in the fringes of the settled areas—the oases of Ghardaya and Wargla, Djerba Island, and the Nafusa Mountains—mostly engaging in theological activity.

One scholar argues that the Hausa culture hero Bayajidda represents a folk personification of the supporters of Abu Yazid who fled North Africa after his defeat.

References

Citations

Bibliography

External links
 Abu Yazid al-Khariji

880s births
947 deaths
10th-century Berber people
10th-century people from the Fatimid Caliphate
10th-century people of Ifriqiya
Kharijites
Rebellions against the Fatimid Caliphate
Ibadi Muslims
Prisoners and detainees of the Fatimid Caliphate
Zenata